Micro Nation is an Australian sitcom web television series that aired on Eleven from 15 October to 2 November 2012.

The series was created and directed by Andrew Garrick, who also wrote the screenplay with Ben Jenkins, Alexandra Lee, David Harmon, Adam Yardley and Mark Sutton.

Synopsis
The series is set on the forgotten island micronation of Pullamawang and follows the adventures of its young citizen Emma who desperately wants to leave.

When Australia federated in 1901, the island of Pullamawang forgot to mail in their paperwork, and they remained a separate country. Over the years, they’ve created their own customs and rules of government without anybody outside the town really noticing.

Following the discovery of diamonds, egos, aspirations and greed are sent skyrocketing. It all culminates in an explosion of nationalistic fervour as Pullamawang declares war on Australia.

Cast
 Roz Hammond as Kingess Betty Cosdosca 
 Harriet Dyer as Emma Cosdosca 
 Dan Cordeaux as Paul Cosdosca 
 Lliam Amor as Menzies McFadden 
 James Mackay as Lindsay MacFadden
 Jon Williams as Barry 
 John Leary as Pete  
 Rowena Wallace as Tottie Nesbit 
 Rebecca De Unamuno as Chef Tracy
 David Collins as Blind Billy Mackerel 
 Kit Brookman as Little Timmy
 Spike as Constable Woofster
 Roy Billing as Narrator

Episodes

References

External links
 

10 Peach original programming
Australian television sitcoms
2012 Australian television series debuts
2012 Australian television series endings
English-language television shows
Television series by Freehand Productions
Works about micronations